Pleasant Township is one of twelve townships in Porter County, Indiana. As of the 2010 census, its population was 4,432.

History
Pleasant Township was organized in 1836, and named for the scenic landscapes within its borders.

The Collier Lodge site was listed on the National Register of Historic Places in 2009.

Cities and towns
The township's only incorporated community is Kouts.

Education
The township is served by the East Porter County School Corporation.  Its high school is Kouts Middle-High School located in Kouts.

Cemeteries

References

External links
 Indiana Township Association
 United Township Association of Indiana

Townships in Porter County, Indiana
Townships in Indiana